Chandramara chandramara is a species of catfish in the family Bagridae. It is native to Bangladesh and India. This species reaches about 5 centimetres (2 in) SL and inhabits beels, ditches, streams, and canals. It is the only species in the monotypic genus Chandramara.

This fish has a semi-transparent body which may or may not have speckles. This fish is a schooling species.

References

Bagridae
Catfish of Asia
Freshwater fish of India
Fish of Bangladesh
Monotypic fish genera
Fish described in 1922
Taxa named by Francis Buchanan-Hamilton
Fish described in 1822